Mord in bester Gesellschaft is a German television series starring Fritz Wepper and his daughter Sophie Wepper.

See also
List of German television series

External links
 

2007 German television series debuts
2010s German television series
German crime television series
German-language television shows
Das Erste original programming